or ) is a mountain in the Highlands of Scotland. It lies in the very heart of the Cairngorm mountains, and is one of the most remote in the region. Beinn Mheadoin is surrounded by deep glens and mountain lakes, including Loch A'an, Loch Etchachan and the Dubh Lochan.

The summit is broad and flat. It is noted for its summit tors - large boulders left by retreating ice sheets at the end of the last ice age. The highest point is, in fact, the top of one of the largest tors, and a scramble is required to reach it.

Climbing
The mountain is remote; the shortest route is to climb over the main Cairn Gorm plateau in order to ascend Beinn Mheadhoin. The shortest route of ascent is from the Coire Cas car park at the foot of the Cairn Gorm ski area, initially heading for the ridge of Fiacaill a' Choire Chais. From the head of the ridge, the walker then descends to Loch Avon via Coire Raibert. The route then goes round the head of the loch, passing the famous Shelter Stone, before rising again to reach Loch Etchachan. From here the route heads northeast onto the summit ridge.

Beinn Mheadhoin may also be climbed from the south, via Glen Derry. This route is much longer, though a bicycle can be used on the track to shorten the time taken. An ascent from this direction could conceivably be combined with an ascent of Derry Cairngorm.

See also
 List of Munro mountains
 Mountains and hills of Scotland

References 

Munros
Marilyns of Scotland
Mountains and hills of the Cairngorms
Mountains and hills of Moray
One-thousanders of Scotland